Juan Figueroa may refer to:

 Juan Figueroa (activist) (born 1953), Puerto Rican activist
 Juan Figueroa (footballer) (born 1992), Argentine goalkeeper